The 2019 Thurrock Council election was held on 2 May 2019 to elect members of the Thurrock Council in England.

Election
A third of the seats were elected on 2 May 2019. Prior to the election, the council was under no overall control, governed by a minority Conservative administration. They held 23 of 49 seats, while Labour held 17 seats, followed by the Thurrock Independents on 9 seats.

Elections were held in a total of sixteen wards, with Conservative, Labour, and Thurrock Independent candidates standing in each ward. UKIP stood two candidates. The Green Party, the Liberal Democrats, and the British Union & Sovereignty Party stood one candidate each in Chafford & North Stifford, Grays Riverside, and Belhus respectively. There were also two independents standing for election in Thurrock.

Results Summary

Changes in vote share are calculated from the 2015 election result, which was the last time this set of wards were up for election.

Prior to the election one seat was vacant.

Candidates

Aveley & Uplands

Belhus

Chadwell St. Mary

Chafford & North Stifford

Hamilton served as a councillor for Belhus Ward prior to the election.

Corringham & Fobbing

East Tilbury

Grays Riverside

Grays Thurrock

Little Thurrock

Cherry was a councillor for Chadwell St Mary Ward prior to the election.

Ockendon

Stanford East & Corringham Town

Stanford-le-Hope West

Stifford Clays

The Homesteads

Tilbury Riverside & Thurrock Park

West Thurrock & South Stifford

References

2019 English local elections
2019
2010s in Essex
May 2019 events in the United Kingdom